Rickey Hagood ( – ) was a former American football defensive tackle. He played for the San Diego Chargers in 1984.

References

1961 births
American football defensive tackles
South Carolina Gamecocks football players
San Diego Chargers players
1994 deaths